Castleton Knight, OBE (1894–1970) was a British film producer and director. He worked at one point as managing director of British Gaumont's newsreel division. He directed several feature films, but worked primarily in documentaries. He produced and directed the 1953 Technicolor documentary A Queen Is Crowned about the Coronation of Queen Elizabeth II.

Selected filmography

Director
The Plaything (1929)
The Flying Scotsman (1929)
The Lady from the Sea (1929)
Kissing Cup's Race (1930)
For Freedom (1940)

References

Bibliography
Monk, Claire & Sargeant, Amy. British Historical Cinema: The History, Heritage and Costume Film. Routledge, 2002.

External links

1894 births
1970 deaths
Film producers from London
Film directors from London
Officers of the Order of the British Empire
People from Bromley